Gnomidolon musivum is a species of beetle found in the Cerambycidae family. It was described by Wilhelm Ferdinand Erichson in 1847.

References

Gnomidolon
Beetles described in 1847